This is a timeline of Pinterest, an Internet service that serves as a "visual discovery tool", as well as the eponymous company.

Overview

Full timeline

See also
 Timeline of social media

References

How to login to your pinterest account

Pinterest
Pinterest